Deltatheridiidae is an extinct family of basal carnivorous metatherians that lived in the Cretaceous and were closely related to marsupials. Their fossils are restricted to Central Asia (Mongolia and Uzbekistan) and North America (United States - Oklahoma, Texas, Utah, Wyoming). They mostly disappeared in the KT event, but a ghost lineage, currently represented by Gurbanodelta, survived until the late Paleocene by decreasing in size and becoming insectivorous.

The family consist in six genera:
Atokatheridium 
Deltatheridium 
Deltatheroides 
Gurbanodelta 
Lotheridium 
Oklatheridium 
Nanocuris 
Sulestes 
Tsagandelta

References

Prehistoric metatherians
Aptian first appearances
Thanetian extinctions
Prehistoric mammal families